Filipinas Orient Airways, Inc. was an airline founded by the originally Lebanese refugee family Karam (later Caram) in the Philippines in 1964, under Republic Act No. 4147. FOA was granted the franchise to provide air transport service in the Philippines and between the Philippines and other countries on June 20, 1964, despite legal opposition by Philippine Airlines. The company slogan was The Nation's Flag Carrier.

Service

FOA - also known as "Fairways" - started their domestic flight operations in the Philippines on January 5, 1965 using DC-3 aircraft .
Their early days appear to have been crash-ridden with the loss of four DC-3 and one DC-6 within the first 4 years of operation. 
They went on to operate Sud Aviation Caravelles  and Nord 262, later to be replaced 
by NAMC YS-11. 
Their flight operations were ended after the declaration of Martial Law by then Philippine President Ferdinand Marcos on 21 September 1972. Philippine Airlines eventually took over the planes and routes of FOA.

Fleet
 Douglas DC-3A
 Sud Aviation Caravelle
 NAMC YS-11
 Nord 262

Destinations

Accidents and incidents
On 23 April 1969, Douglas DC-3A PI-C947 was damaged beyond economic repair in a landing accident at Roxas City Airport. All 31 passengers and crew survived.

References

External links

Companies based in Manila
Defunct airlines of the Philippines
Airlines established in 1964
Airlines disestablished in 1972
Philippine companies established in 1964